
Gmina Lesko is an urban-rural gmina (administrative district) in Lesko County, Subcarpathian Voivodeship, in south-eastern Poland.

The gmina contains part of the protected area called Słonne Mountains Landscape Park.

Villages
Apart from the town of Lesko, Gmina Lesko contains the villages and settlements of Bachlawa, Bezmiechowa Dolna, Bezmiechowa Górna, Dziurdziów, Glinne, Hoczew, Huzele, Jankowce, Łączki, Łukawica, Manasterzec, Postołów, Średnia Wieś and Weremień.

Neighbouring gminas
Gmina Lesko is bordered by the gminas of Baligród, Olszanica, Sanok, Solina, Tyrawa Wołoska and Zagórz.

References
Polish official population figures 2006

Lesko
Lesko County